A.S.D. Lanciano Calcio 1920 is an Italian football club. The club was renamed from A.S.D. Marcianese in 2016 as a homage to the first football club of the city, which founded in 1920. In 2016, also saw the withdrew of the major club of the city, S.S. Virtus Lanciano 1924, from professional football. That team was a successor of another incorporation of the club, S.S. Lanciano, in 2008.

History
The main football club of Lanciano, has a number of re-foundations. In 2008, S.S. Virtus Lanciano 1924 was founded and obtain a permit from the Italian Football Federation (FIGC) as an official successor of S.S. Lanciano, which was folded in the same year.

However, due to financial problems, Virtus Lanciano also folded their first team in 2016.

In the same year, a smaller club, A.S.D. Marcianese, renamed itself A.S.D. Lanciano Calcio 1920 and self claimed as a successor.

The first team of Lanciano 1920 competed in Prima Categoria Abruzzo (Italian 7th highest level) in the 2016–17 season, and won promotion to Promozione Abruzzo, the Italian 6th highest level in April 2018. Lanciano Calcio 1920 promoted to Eccellenza Abruzzo in 2019.

Derbies
Both Virtus Lanciano and Lanciano 1920 (the latter sometimes just known as Lanciano) still competes in youth sector as of 2020–21 season. In the 2017–18 Prima Categoria season, the first team of Lanciano Calcio 1920, also had city derbies with Athletic Lanciano. In the same season, there is the 4th Lanciano club, Lanciano F.C., which played in Terza Categoria, renamed from Guastameroli at the start of that season. Athletic Lanciano also claimed as a successor of Virtus Lanciano by the form of wearing the jersey of Virtus Lanciano directly, instead of its own "red-black" strip design.

References

External links
 

Football clubs in Abruzzo
Association football clubs established in 2016
2016 establishments in Italy
Companies based in the Province of Chieti